MTN Rwanda, whose complete name is MTN Rwandacell Plc, is the largest telecommunications company in Rwanda, with an estimated 6.4 million subscribers, accounting for 62.8 percent market share, as of 31 September 2021.

Location
The headquarters of MTN Rwandacell Plc are located at MTN Centre, Nyarutarama, Kigali, Rwanda. This location is in one of the upscale suburbs of the city of Kigali, the national capital. The geographical coordinates of the headquarters of MTN Rwanda are 1°56'27.0"S 30°06'13.0"E (Latitude:-1.940833; Longitude:30.103611).

Overview
MTN Rwanda is a subsidiary of MTN Group, a multinational telecommunications group connecting approximately 232 million people in 22 countries across Africa and the Middle East, as of 2016. MTN Rwanda was established in 1998.

Listing
In May 2021, the shares of stock of MTN Rwanda were listed on the Rwanda Stock Exchange.

Governance
As of February 2022, the chairman of MTN Rwanda is Faustin K. Mbundu, an independent, non executive director. The CEO/Managing Director is Mitwa Kaemba Ng’ambi.

See also
 List of mobile network operators in Rwanda

References

External links
 Official website

MTN Group
Kigali
Telecommunications companies established in 1998
1998 establishments in Rwanda
Telecommunications companies of Rwanda
Mobile phone companies of Rwanda